Peter Cozzens (born 1957) is an American historian and retired U.S. Foreign Service Officer.  He has written and/or edited over seventeen books on the American Civil War and the American Indian Wars.

Early life 
Peter Cozzens grew up in Wheaton, Illinois.

Career

The Earth Is Weeping 
The Earth Is Weeping chronicles the Indian Wars for the American West in their totality. Cozzens begins his narrative with the 1866 resistance movement led by Red Cloud.

Smithsonian.com named it one of the top ten history books of 2016.  Amazon highlighted it as one of the best books of 2016 in the history category.

It is the recipient of the 2016 Guggenheim-Lehrman Prize in Military History awarded for the best book published on the subject in the English language in 2016.

Awards 

He received the Superior Honor Award from the US State Department in 1997. In 2002, he received The William R. Rivkin Award from the American Foreign Service Association, awarded to one Foreign Service Officer annually for "extraordinary accomplishment involving initiative, integrity, intellectual courage and constructive dissent". He also received an Alumni Achievement Award from his alma mater Knox College. Cozzens was named the 2016 recipient of the Gilder Lehrman Prize for Military History for his book, The Earth is Weeping.

Cozzens serves on the Advisory Council of the Lincoln Prize.

Personal life 
He lives with his wife Antonia Feldman in Kensington, Maryland.

He has detailed his history with bipolar disorder and mental illness, including the potential the condition had to enable his writing career.

Selected works

References

External links
 
  PeterCozzens
 
 Wilson Center

Living people
21st-century American historians
American male non-fiction writers
People from Wheaton, Illinois
Knox College (Illinois) alumni
Historians from Illinois
American writers
21st-century American male writers
1957 births